Clifford Darnell Johnson (born 1954) is an American lawyer who has served as the United States attorney for the Northern District of Indiana since October 2021.

Early life and education 
Johhson was born in Gary, Indiana. He earned a Bachelor of Arts degree from Valparaiso University in 1976 and a Juris Doctor from the Valparaiso University School of Law in 1980.

Career 
From 1980 to 1985, Johnson served as a trial attorney in the United States Department of Justice Civil Rights Division. He then joined the Northern District of Indiana as an Assistant United States Attorney in 1986. He served as the chief of the Civil Division from 1997 to 2010, first assistant United States attorney from 2010 to 2020, and acting United States attorney for several months in 2017, succeeding David A. Capp. He retired from the office in August 2020.

United States attorney for Northern District of Indiana 
On July 26, 2021, President Joe Biden nominated Johnson to be the United States attorney for the Northern District of Indiana. On September 23, 2021, his nomination was reported out of committee. On September 30, 2021, his nomination was confirmed in the United States Senate by voice vote. President Biden signed his commission on October 5, 2021, and he was formally sworn into office by the chief judge of the district, Jon DeGuilio, on October 6, 2021.

References

External links
 Biography at U.S. Department of Justice

1954 births
Living people
20th-century American lawyers
20th-century African-American people
21st-century African-American people
21st-century American lawyers
African-American lawyers
Assistant United States Attorneys
Indiana lawyers
People from Gary, Indiana
United States Attorneys for the Northern District of Indiana
United States Department of Justice lawyers
Valparaiso University alumni
Valparaiso University School of Law alumni